This article is about the particular significance of the century 1001–1100 to Wales and its people.

Events

1005
Aeddan ap Blegywryd succeeds Cynan ab Hywel as Prince of Gwynedd.
1018
Llywelyn ap Seisyll defeats Aeddan ap Blegywryd in battle; Aeddan and his four sons are killed. Through marriage to Angharad ferch Maredudd ab Owain.
1022
Llywelyn ap Seisyll defeats the Irish pretender Rhain at Abergwili.
1045
Gruffydd ap Rhydderch expels Gruffydd ap Llywelyn from Deheubarth.
1055
24 October - Gruffydd ap Llywelyn defeats Ralph the Timid and sacks Hereford. He is now ruler of all Wales.
1056
10 February - Gruffydd ap Llywelyn defeats an English army at Glasbury.
1062
Harold Godwinson makes a surprise attack on Gruffydd ap Llywelyn at Rhuddlan; Gruffydd escapes.
1063
Tostig leads an army into north Wales.
1067
Chepstow Castle is founded by William FitzOsbern, 1st Earl of Hereford.
1070
Battle of Mechain between the sons of Gruffydd ap Llywelyn and the sons of Cynfyn ap Gwerstan of Powys. 
Bleddyn ap Cynfyn enacts new laws regulating the activities of bards and musicians.
1081
Battle of Mynydd Carn: Gruffudd ap Cynan and Rhys ap Tewdwr defeat Trahaearn ap Caradog, Caradog ap Gruffydd and Meilir ap Rhiwallon. However, Gruffudd ap Cynan is subsequently captured and imprisoned by Hugh d'Avranches, 1st Earl of Chester, and his kingdom is granted to Robert of Rhuddlan, Hugh's cousin.
1088
Bernard de Neufmarché begins creation of the Lordship of Brecknock by conquest.
1092
Hervey le Breton is appointed Bishop of Bangor by William II of England.
1093
3 July - Robert of Rhuddlan is killed by a Welsh raiding party on the shores of the Great Orme and rule of his lands is taken over directly by his cousin Hugh of Chester.
1094
Welsh revolt against Anglo-Norman rule. Cadwgan ap Bleddyn of Powys defeats a Norman force at the battle of Coed Yspwys.
1095
Battle of Aber Llech secures Bernard de Neufmarché's Lordship of Brecknock, leading to the encastellation of Brycheiniog.
William II of England attempts to suppress the revolt in north Wales with little success.
1096
Battle of Celli Carnant in Pembrokeshire.
1097
William II of England again attempts to suppress the revolt (at this time led by Cadwgan ap Bleddyn) with little success.
1098
Hugh d'Avranches, Earl of Chester, and Hugh of Montgomery, Earl of Shrewsbury, attempt to recover lost Anglo-Norman territory in Gwynedd. In the Battle of Anglesey Sound (June or July) in which Magnus Barefoot, King of Norway, intervenes and Hugh of Shrewsbury is killed, the Normans are forced to give up Anglesey.
1099
Gruffudd ap Cynan (having previously escaped from imprisonment) regains the throne of Gwynedd; and Cadwgan ap Bleddyn is able to reclaim part of Powys and Ceredigion on condition of doing homage to the new Earl of Shrewsbury, Robert of Bellême.

Births
1054
probable - Robert II, Duke of Normandy (a prisoner in Cardiff Castle during the 12th century)

Deaths
1005
date unknown - Cynan ap Hywel, Prince of Gwynedd
1010
probable - Elystan Glodrydd, founder of the fifth Royal Tribe of Wales
1018
date unknown - Aeddan ap Blegywryd, Prince of Gwynedd
1023
date unknown - Llywelyn ap Seisyll, King of Gwynedd and Deheubarth
1025
date unknown - Cynan ap Seisyll, brother of Llywelyn ap Seisyll
1033
date unknown - Rhydderch ap Iestyn, ruler of Gwent, Morgannwg, Deheubarth and Powys
1044
date unknown - Hywel ab Edwin, Prince of Deheubarth
1039
date unknown - Iago ab Idwal ap Meurig, Prince of Gwynedd
1055
date unknown - Gruffydd ap Rhydderch (in battle)
1063
5 August - Gruffydd ap Llywelyn, ruler of Wales (assassinated)
probable - Cynan ab Iago, Prince of Gwynedd
1070
probable - Rhiwallon ap Cynfyn, Prince and co-ruler of Gwynedd and Powys
1075
date unknown - Bleddyn ap Cynfyn, Prince of Gwynedd and Powys
1078
date unknown - Rhys ab Owain, King of Deheubarth
1081
At the Battle of Mynydd Carn (date unknown)
Trahaearn ap Caradog, Prince of Gwynedd
Caradog ap Gruffydd
1088
3 July - Robert of Rhuddlan, Norman adventurer and lord of north-east Wales
1093
April - Rhys ap Tewdwr, king of Deheubarth (killed in battle)
date unknown - Iestyn ap Gwrgant, last native ruler of Glamorgan
1094
27 July - Roger de Montgomerie, 1st Earl of Shrewsbury
1099
date unknown - Rhigyfarch, author of Life of Saint David

References